Metagaming is a strategic approach to a game which transcends its prescribed rules, environment or in-game information.

Metagaming or Metagame may also refer to:
Metagaming (role-playing games), use of facts about a game not known to one's character
Metagaming Concepts, a publisher of board and role-playing games (1974–1983)
Metagame, a docufilm spinoff of The Smash Brothers